Madrona is a mostly residential neighborhood in east Seattle, Washington. It is bounded on the east by Lake Washington; on the south by E. Cherry Street, beyond which is Leschi; on the west by Martin Luther King Jr. Way, beyond which is the Central District; and on the north by E. Howell Street, beyond which is Denny-Blaine.

The neighborhood's main thoroughfares are E. Union and E. Cherry Streets (east- and westbound), Madrona Drive (northwest- and southeast-bound), and 34th Avenue and Lake Washington Boulevard (north- and southbound). It is home to Madrona Park and the 34th Avenue and E. Union commercial area.

History 
The neighborhood was named by John Ayer, who contributed the land for Madrona Park, after a species of tree (Arbutus) common to the area.

Madrona's motto, "The Peaceable Kingdom," reflects its racially mixed heritage. In the early 20th century, the coal mining industry brought Chinese immigrants to Madrona. Later, the shipbuilding boom brought an influx of African Americans. For most of the second half of the 20th century, 34th Avenue divided the neighborhood between mostly middle-class African American (to the west) and upper-class Caucasian (to the east). The Black Panthers used the Madrona Playfield on Spring Street and 34th Avenue as its marching drill location in Seattle .

In more recent years, as the neighborhood has gentrified, Madrona has seen a steady decline in its Black population. The 2018 American Community Survey 5-Year Estimates notes that, of the 5,675 residents in King County Census Tract 78 (covering Madrona east of 31st Avenue), 75% are White Non-Hispanic (up from 65% in 1990), 6% are African American (down from 29% in 1990), 4% are Asian (4% in 1990), 11% are Mixed race, and 4% are Hispanic. Census tract 77 with 5,382 residents, two-thirds of which is in the Central District, is 67% White Non-Hispanic, 13% African American, 7% Asian, 8% Mixed race, and 5% Hispanic.

References

External links

Madrona Neighborhood website
Madrona neighborhood profile and stats
Seattle City Clerk: Madrona neighborhood